Tamoyada dam is a gravity barrage-dam located in Saitama prefecture in Japan. The structure is used to divert water for agriculture, and to generate hydro-electricity. The catchment area of the dam is 893 km2. The dam impounds about 47ha of land when full and can store 37 thousand cubic meters of water. The construction of the dam was started on 1962 and completed in 1964.

References

Dams in Saitama Prefecture
1964 establishments in Japan